Attorney General Johnston may refer to:

Alexander Johnston (1775–1849), Attorney General of British Ceylon
Augustus Johnston (1729–1790), Attorney General of the Colony of Rhode Island and Providence Plantations
William Agnew Johnston (1848–1937), Attorney General of Kansas

See also
 Attorney General Johnson (disambiguation)